HMS L25 was a L-class submarine built for the Royal Navy during World War I. She was one of five boats in the class to be fitted as a minelayer. The boat survived the war and was sold for scrap in 1935.

Design and description
L9 and its successors were enlarged to accommodate 21-inch (53.3 cm) torpedoes and more fuel. They displaced  on the surface and  submerged. The L-class submarines had a crew of 38 officers and ratings.

For surface running, the boats were powered by two 12-cylinder Vickers  diesel engines, each driving one propeller shaft. When submerged each propeller was driven by a  electric motor. They could reach  on the surface and  underwater.

The boats were armed with four 21-inch torpedo tubes in the bow. They carried four reload torpedoes for the 21-inch tubes for a grand total of eight torpedoes. They were also armed with a  deck gun. L25 was fitted with 14 vertical mine chutes in her saddle tanks and carried one mine per chute.

Construction and career
HMS L25 was built by Vickers, Barrow-in-Furness. She was laid down on 25 February 1918 and was commissioned on 13 February 1919.

L25 ran aground off The Needles, Isle of Wight, on 7 April 1924. She was refloated later that day.

L25 was sold to John Cashmore Ltd for scrapping at Newport, Wales, in 1935. Her ship's bell is in the care of the Royal Navy Submarine Museum.

Notes

References
 
 
 
 

 

British L-class submarines
Ships built in Barrow-in-Furness
1919 ships
World War I submarines of the United Kingdom
Royal Navy ship names
Maritime incidents in 1924